The demographics of Metro Vancouver indicate a multicultural and multiracial region. Metro Vancouver is a metropolitan area, with its major urban centre being Vancouver, British Columbia, Canada. The Vancouver census metropolitan area, as defined by Statistics Canada, encompasses roughly the same territory as the Metro Vancouver Regional District, a regional district in British Columbia. The regional district includes 23 local authorities. Figures provided here are for the Vancouver census metropolitan area and not for the City of Vancouver.

Population growth
The following table shows the development of the number of inhabitants according to census data of Statistics Canada. The former municipalities of Point Grey and South Vancouver are not included in the data prior to 1931.

Population by municipality 
The Metro Vancouver Regional District comprises 23 member authorities — 21 municipalities, one electoral area, and one treaty First Nation.

Ethnic diversity 
The demographics of Metro Vancouver reveal a multi-ethnic society. There remains a small population, less than 2%, of Aboriginal peoples, who according to archeological and historical records, have inhabited this region for more than 3,000 years.

From the time of the region's first non-indigenous settlement in the second half of the 19th century, people from Britain and Ireland were the largest group of immigrants and, collectively, remain the largest ethnic grouping in Vancouver to this day. The largest non British or Irish ethnic groups situated in Vancouver include Chinese, Indians and Germans.

The metropolitan area has one of the most diverse Chinese-speaking communities with several varieties of Chinese being represented. Metro Vancouver contains the second-largest Chinatown in North America (after San Francisco's), and many multicultural neighbourhoods such as the Punjabi Market, Greektown, and Japantown. Commercial Drive, the core of the historic Little Italy, which is also the main Portuguese area, has become an alternative-culture focus, though traditional Italian and Portuguese and other establishments and residents remain in the area.  Bilingual street signs can be seen in Chinatown and the Punjabi Market, and commercial signs in a wide array of languages can be seen all over the metropolitan area.

Metro Vancouver

Visible minorities 
In the city of Vancouver and four adjacent municipalities (Surrey, Burnaby, Richmond, and Coquitlam), there is no visible majority. Hence, the term visible minority is used here in contrast to the overall Canadian population which remains predominantly of European descent. In Metro Vancouver, at the 2021 census, 54.5% of the population were members of non-European ethnic groups, 43.1% were members of European ethnic groups, and 2.4% of the population identified as Indigenous.

Greater Vancouver has more interracial couples than Canada's two largest cities, Toronto and Montreal. In 2011, 9.6% of married and common-law couples in Greater Vancouver are interracial; double the Canadian average of 4.6%, and higher than in the Toronto CMA (8.2%) and the Greater Montreal (5.2%). Vancouver has less residential segregation of its ethnic minorities compared to Canadian cities like Montreal. However, residential segregation in Greater Vancouver continues to persist in certain parts of the metropolitan area.

Note: Totals greater than 100% due to multiple origin responses.

Municipalities

Historic trends

Federal electoral districts

Ethnic groups

Indigenous peoples 
As of around 2009, 3% of residents of Vancouver state that they have at least some ancestry from the First Nations, and of that 3%, over half state that they also have non-First Nations ancestry. A person with some First Nations ancestry may not necessarily identify as someone who is First Nations.

There is a small community of aboriginal people in Vancouver as well as in the surrounding metropolitan region, with the result that Vancouver constitutes the largest native community in the province, albeit an unincorporated one (i.e. not as a band government). There is an equally large or larger Métis contingent.

Indigenous peoples, who make up less than two percent of the city's population, are not considered a visible minority group by Statistics Canada.

Europeans

British Isles

Much of the ethnic white population consists of persons whose origins go back to Britain or Ireland and, until recently, British Columbians with British or Irish ancestry most likely came directly from those islands, rather than via Ontario or the Maritime Provinces. Until the 1960s, it was easier to purchase the Times of London and The Guardian in Vancouver than it was to find the Toronto Globe and Mail or Montreal Gazette.

Continental Europeans

Other large and historically important European ethnic groups consist of Germans, Dutch, French (of both European and Canadian origin), Ukrainians, Scandinavians, Finns, Italians, Croats, Hungarians, Greeks, and lately numerous Romanians, Russians, Portuguese, Serbs and Poles.  Non-visible minorities such as newly arrived Eastern Europeans and the new wave of Latin Americans are also a feature of the city's ethnic landscape. Prior to the Hong Kong influx of the 1980s, the largest non-British Isles ethnic group in the city was German, followed by Ukrainian and the Scandinavian ethnicities. Most of these earlier East European immigrant  are fully assimilated or intermarried with other groups, although a new generation of East Europeans form a distinct linguistic and social community.

East Asians

Chinese

The first Chinese immigrants to British Columbia were men who came to "the British Colonies of Canada," as they called British Columbia, for the Fraser Canyon Gold Rush of 1858 and a decade later to work on building the Canadian Pacific Railway.

Koreans

As of 2014, there are about 70,000 ethnic Koreans in the Vancouver area.

An H-Mart and several Korean restaurants are located on Robson Street. As of 2008, there are many Korean national students at the university and primary/secondary levels studying English. Other areas with Korean businesses include Kingsway in Vancouver, Burnaby, and New Westminster; other areas in Vancouver; North Road in Burnaby and Coquitlam, and areas of Port Coquitlam. As of 2011, Coquitlam is a popular area of settlement for Koreans.

Rimhak Ree (Yi Yimhak) came to Vancouver to study mathematics at the University of British Columbia in 1953, making him the first known ethnic Korean to live in the city. There were about 50 ethnic Koreans in Vancouver in the mid-1960s. The first Korean United Church congregation in the city opened in 1965. Numbers of Korean immigration to Canada increased due to more permissive immigration laws established in the 1960s as well as the home country's political conflict and poverty. There were 1,670 ethnic Koreans in Vancouver by 1975, making up 16% of all ethnic Koreans in Canada and a 3000% increase from the mid-1960s population. Korean immigration to Canada decreased after a more restrictive immigration law was enacted in 1978.

Christianity is a popular religion among ethnic Koreans. About 200 Korean churches are in the Vancouver area.

In 1986 Greater Vancouver had fewer than 5,000 ethnic Koreans. In 1991 the number had increased to 8,330. The number of ethnic Koreans in the Vancouver area increased by 69% in the period 1996 through 2001. The number of university students from Korea choosing to study in Vancouver had become most of the Korean students studying in Canada by the late 1990s. The first Korean grocery store in the North Road area opened in 2000. In 2001 28,850 ethnic Koreans live in Greater Vancouver, and this increased to 44,825 according to the 2006 census.

Canwest Global does a co-venture with the Canada Express, a Korean publication, to serve ethnic Koreans. It previously published a Korean edition of the Vancouver Sun but later stopped. Daniel Ahadi and Catherine A. Murray, authors of "Urban Mediascapes and Multicultural Flows: Assessing Vancouver's Communication Infrastructure," wrote that the Korean edition of the Vancouver Sun was "error-fraught".

South Asians

Punjabis
Punjabi immigrants first arrived in Vancouver during the late 19th century. Most ethnic South Asians in the Lower Mainland are Punjabi Sikhs. Surrey has the largest ethnic South Asian population in Metro Vancouver, at 32.4%. The Newton neighbourhood in Surrey contains the highest percentage of ethnic Indians in a neighbourhood in Metro Vancouver.

Other Asians 
Other significant Asian ethnic groups in Vancouver are Vietnamese, Filipino, Cambodian and Japanese. In Vancouver the term 'Asian' is normally used to refer only to East Asian and Southeast Asian peoples, while South Asians are usually referred to as Indo-Canadian or East Indians. Technically, though, the term 'Asian' may refer to either group, and also to the large Persian and other Middle Eastern populations as well as elements from Central Asia.

Future projections

Language

Knowledge of languages 
The question on knowledge of languages allows for multiple responses. The following figures are from the 2021 Canadian census, and lists languages that were selected by at least 1,000 respondents.

Mother tongue 
The following figures come from the 2021 census profile for Vancouver, the census metropolitan area.

Notes:
 The figures for Cantonese, Mandarin and Minnan do not include 1,125 speakers of "Chinese (not otherwise specified)", some of whom may speak Cantonese, Mandarin or Minnan. The total number of speakers of all varieties of Chinese is 393,030 (15.0% of the population).
 For the separate figures of Hindi and Urdu, see Hindi–Urdu controversy.
 The number of native speakers of both English and French only is 8,240, and with a non-official language too, 2,190. This means the self-identified mother-tongue speakers of both official languages amount to 10,430 (0.4% of the population).
 The 2021 census identified 1,800 individuals who had knowledge of an indigenous language of Canada.

Religion

Vancouver, like the rest of British Columbia, has a low rate of church attendance compared with the rest of the continent and the majority of the population does not practice religion. As of the 2021 Canadian census, 33.1 percent of Greater Vancouver is Christian, the largest percentage of any religion. 13.7 percent are Catholic, 8.7 percent are Christians of unspecified denomination, 7.2 percent are Protestant, 1.4 percent are Christian Orthodox, and 2.2 percent are other Christian or Christian-related traditions. Greater Vancouver has a notable Sikh (8.5 percent) and Buddhist (2.7 percent) population, mostly adherents of South Asian and East Asian ancestry. There is also a significant minority of Muslim residents (4.2 percent).

Immigration

Homelessness 

The 2011 Metro Vancouver Homeless Count revealed that there were at least 2,650 people found to be homeless in Metro Vancouver. This particular homeless count is and continues to be conducted once every three years, taking place over a brief 24-hour period. The report published on these results stated, "It is important to note that all Homeless Counts are inherently undercounts and that the 2011 Metro Vancouver Count was no exception." Nonetheless, these counts can be used as indicators to determine homelessness trends within Metro Vancouver. Between 2002 and 2005, "the count revealed that homelessness in the region nearly doubled from 1121 to 2174 persons".  From 2005 to 2008, the count revealed a much smaller increase in homelessness, from 2174 to 2660 persons. Thus, the count conducted in 2011 implies that the homeless population has remained relatively stable between 2008 and 2011.

Of the homeless people surveyed in 2011, "71% were sheltered in either an emergency shelter, safe house, transition house or temporary facility such as a hospital, jail or detoxification centre...while 29% slept in outdoor locations or at someone else's place". 74 of the 2,650 homeless persons counted were children – those under the age of 19 – who accompanied a parent who was also homeless. Furthermore, of the homeless youth surveyed, 102 individuals were under the age of 19, 221 between the ages of 19–24, and 74 whose ages could not be identified, for a total of 397 homeless. Adults constituted the largest cohort of homeless in Metro Vancouver with 275 individuals between the ages of 25–34, 328 between the ages of 35–44, and 397 between the ages of 45–54, for a total of 1,000 homeless. Lastly, seniors – those above the age of 55 – constituted 268 homeless people. Of the 2,650 people identified in the count, ages for 985 people could not be provided.

Homelessness doesn't occur suddenly, rather it is a progression wherein an individual becomes part of the group of 'at risk' individuals, remains in this group for some time, and then, finally, becomes homeless due to economic hardships and social dislocation. "Contemporary definitions split homelessness into two broad groups: 'absolute' homelessness, which refers to persons or households literally without physical shelter, and 'relative' homelessness, which includes a range of housing situations characterized as being at-risk of homelessness." Indeed, being classified as at-risk of homelessness does not imply that an individual or household will become homeless in the future, only that various pre-conditions exist that may lead to this. These pre-conditions include, but are not restricted to the following: people living in SROs (Single Room Occupancy), people living in rooming houses, and people paying more than 50% of their net income towards housing costs. "Two-thirds of responses from homeless individuals enumerated in a recent homeless count in Greater Vancouver cited economic reasons for their being homeless – with lack of income and cost of housing accounting for 44% and 22% of responses respectively."

Housing affordability has and continues to be the top priority housing issue Vancouverites must resolve. In 1996, a study published by BC Housing revealed that 25% of renter households in Vancouver pay 50% or more of their incomes to rent. The core housing need model, developed by the CMHC, uses a threshold of households spending at least 30% of their income on shelter costs to illuminate households experiencing acute housing affordability needs. "Moving from the 30% shelter cost-to-income ratio (STIR) used in the core housing need model, to a 50% threshold, typically reduces the number of households identified by more than half." In 2001, Statistics Canada published a study using both the 30% and 50% thresholds to identify renters and homeowners facing unaffordable housing costs in Metro Vancouver. This study revealed that 8.1% of homeowners and 27.8% of renters exceeded the 30% threshold, while 4.0% of homeowners and 10.8% of renters exceeded the 50% threshold. More in depth still, this study also found that 18.5% of immigrants living in Vancouver exceeded the 30% threshold and 8.0% exceed the 50% threshold. Only 11.3% and 4.8% of Canadian born households exceeded the 30% and 50% thresholds, respectively.

Heather Smith and David Ley found that in Canada's gateway cities, "the appreciable growth of the low-income population during the 1990s was almost entirely attributable to the growing poverty of recent immigrants". They go on to state, "adult immigrants who had landed in the previous decade endured a poverty rate of...37 percent in Vancouver". Immigrants, recent and old, therefore constitute a large proportion of households in Metro Vancouver considered to be at-risk of homelessness. Analysis conducted by Robert Fiedler revealed that, in 2001, "29.1% of persons in households...in Greater Vancouver are below more than one CMHC housing standard, indicating that...some households not only must spend an unsustainably high proportion of their income on shelter costs, but must also live in overcrowded and/or substandard conditions to access housing". Although many new immigrants to Canada come from educated backgrounds, many having bachelor's degrees, they are paid less on average than Canadian born individuals and "Over the past 25 years, the incomes of recent immigrants to Canada have progressively declined relative to the native-born."

Recently, the City of Vancouver released a new strategy targeting homelessness and affordable housing. The strategy will be enacted in 2012 and will run until 2021, with the goal of ending street homelessness completely by 2015, as well as increasing affordable housing choices for all Vancouverites. The City of Vancouver indicates that from 2002 to 2011, "homelessness has increased nearly three-fold" from approximately 628 homeless in 2002, to 1,605 homeless in 2011. The strategy goes on to report that SRO rooms are increasingly being lost to conversions and rent increases even though SRO hotels constitute a majority of Vancouver's lowest income housing stock. As Robert Fiedler noted in 2006, "renters are disproportionately located in the City of Vancouver, which contains only 27.8% of the area's total population, but 40.2% of all renters". Furthermore, low vacancy rates in Vancouver's market rental stock, a decreasing new supply of apartments in recent decades, and a widening gap of household incomes and housing prices are just a few challenges that must be overcome. By 2021, the City of Vancouver hopes to enable 5,000 additional social housing units, 11,000 new market rental-housing units, and 20,000 market ownership units.

Notes

Citations

References
 Baker, Don. "Koreans in Vancouver: A Short History." Journal of the Canadian Historical Association, 2008, Vol.19(2), pp. 155–180

Further reading
 Gumpp, Ruth. "Ethnicity and Assimilation: German Postwar Immigrants in Vancouver, 1945–1970" (MA thesis). University of British Columbia, 1989.
 Walhouse, Freda. 1961. The Influence of Minority Ethnic Groups on the Culture Geography of Vancouver (MA thesis), University of British Columbia.

Greater Vancouver
Vancouver